Seo Dong-won  (born December 12, 1973) is a South Korean former football player who played at forward.

He was included in the South Korea U20 for the 1991 FIFA World Youth Championship and 1993 FIFA World Youth Championship.

Club career 
 1997–1999 Ulsan Hyundai

References

External links
 
 

1973 births
Living people
Association football midfielders
South Korean footballers
South Korea international footballers
K League 1 players
Ulsan Hyundai FC players
Pohang Steelers players
Korea University alumni
Place of birth missing (living people)
South Korean football managers
South Korean expatriate football managers